Javier Bermejo Merino (born 23 December 1978 in Puertollano) is a Spanish athlete specializing in the high jump. He competed at the 2004 and 2008 Summer Olympics without qualifying for the final.

His personal best jump is 2.28 metres achieved in 2004 and 2009.

Competition record

References

External links
 

1978 births
Living people
Spanish male high jumpers
Athletes (track and field) at the 2004 Summer Olympics
Athletes (track and field) at the 2008 Summer Olympics
Olympic athletes of Spain
People from Puertollano
Sportspeople from the Province of Ciudad Real
Athletes (track and field) at the 2005 Mediterranean Games
Athletes (track and field) at the 2009 Mediterranean Games
Mediterranean Games competitors for Spain